Bryan Anthony Warrick (born July 22, 1959) is an American retired professional basketball player. He was a 6'5" (195 cm) 218 lb (99 kg) point guard and played collegiately at Saint Joseph's University where he was named to the East Coast Conference and Philadelphia Big 5 First Teams.

Early life 
Born in Moses Lake, Washington, Warrick was raised in Burlington Township, New Jersey. He played basketball and was a two-time prep champion as quarterback for the football team at Burlington Township High School.

Career 
Warrick was selected with the second pick of the second round in the 1982 NBA draft by the Washington Bullets. His NBA career, which lasted from 1982 to 1986, included stints with the Bullets, Los Angeles Clippers, Milwaukee Bucks, and Indiana Pacers.

Personal life 
Warrick is a resident of Mount Laurel, New Jersey.

Career statistics

NBA

|-
| align="left" | 1982–83
| align="left" | Washington
| 43 || 20 || 16.9 || .380 || .000 || .737 || 1.6 || 2.9 || 0.5 || 0.2 || 4.0
|-
| align="left" | 1983–84
| align="left" | Washington
| 32 || 0 || 7.9 || .409 || .333 || .500 || 0.7 || 1.3 || 0.3 || 0.1 || 2.0
|-
| align="left" | 1984–85
| align="left" | Los Angeles
| 58 || 1 || 12.3 || .491 || .250 || .772 || 1.0 || 2.6 || 0.4 || 0.1 || 3.7
|-
| align="left" | 1985–86
| align="left" | Milwaukee
| 5 || 0 || 5.4 || .400 || .500 || 1.000 || 0.6 || 1.2 || 0.4 || 0.0 || 2.0
|-
| align="left" | 1985–86
| align="left" | Indiana
| 31 || 5 || 21.2 || .471 || .200 || .791 || 2.1 || 3.5 || 0.8 || 0.1 || 7.0
|- class="sortbottom"
| style="text-align:center;" colspan="2"| Career
| 169 || 26 || 14.1 || .443 || .208 || .747 || 1.3 || 2.6 || 0.5 || 0.1 || 4.0
|}

College

|-
| align="left" | 1978–79
| align="left" | St. Joseph's
| 24 || - || 9.0 || .403 || - || .667 || 1.0 || 0.8 || 0.5 || 0.1 || 3.3
|-
| align="left" | 1979–80
| align="left" | St. Joseph's
| 30 || - || 34.4 || .473 || - || .735 || 2.7 || 3.1 || 1.7 || 0.4 || 11.9
|-
| align="left" | 1980–81
| align="left" | St. Joseph's
| 29 || - || 33.3 || .451 || - || .683 || 2.7 || 3.0 || 1.9 || 0.3 || 13.5
|-
| align="left" | 1981–82
| align="left" | St. Joseph's
| 30 || 30 || 35.2 || .507 || - || .776 || 3.2 || 5.0 || 2.1 || 0.5 || 14.9
|- class="sortbottom"
| style="text-align:center;" colspan="2"| Career
| 113 || 30 || 29.0 || .472 || - || .730 || 2.5 || 3.1 || 1.6 || 0.3 || 11.3
|}

References

External links
NBA stats @ basketballreference.com
 College Stats

1959 births
Living people
21st-century African-American people
African-American basketball players
American expatriate basketball people in Germany
American men's basketball players
Basketball players from New Jersey
Basketball players from Washington (state)
BSC Saturn Köln players
Indiana Pacers players
Los Angeles Clippers players
Milwaukee Bucks players
People from Burlington Township, New Jersey
People from Moses Lake, Washington
People from Mount Laurel, New Jersey
Point guards
Rockford Lightning players
Saint Joseph's Hawks men's basketball players
Sportspeople from Burlington County, New Jersey
Washington Bullets draft picks
Washington Bullets players
Wisconsin Flyers players
20th-century African-American sportspeople